Antonio Serravalle (born 18 September 2002) is a Canadian race car driver from Toronto, Ontario with residence in Unionville, Ontario.

Partial Seasons 2018-2019-2020-2021-2022 

Indy Pro/Promazda- Best Finish P4

Indy lights- Best Finish P6

Racing record

Career summary

* Season still in progress.

American open–wheel racing results

Pro Mazda Championship

Indy Lights

Complete WeatherTech SportsCar Championship results 
(key) (Races in bold indicate pole position; races in italics indicate fastest lap)

References

External links
 Antonio Serravalle
 

2002 births
Living people
Canadian racing drivers
Indy Pro 2000 Championship drivers
Formula Regional Americas Championship drivers
Indy Lights drivers
RP Motorsport drivers
Dale Coyne Racing drivers
Karting World Championship drivers
HMD Motorsports drivers
WeatherTech SportsCar Championship drivers